"Set Me Free" is a song by Israeli singer Eden Alene. The song represented Israel in the Eurovision Song Contest 2021 in Rotterdam, the Netherlands, after winning the pre-selection competition HaShir Shelanu L'Eurovizion. Its original version was released on 25 January 2021, accompanied by a music video on the official Eurovision YouTube channel.

On 26 March 2021, the song's new version was revealed, alongside a new music video. It was shot at Design City Centre in Mishor Adumim. The new version of the song notably includes a B6 whistle note, the highest note in the history of the Eurovision Song Contest.

Eurovision Song Contest

The song represented Israel in the Eurovision Song Contest 2021, after it was chosen through HaShir Shelanu L'Eurovizion. On 17 November 2020, the EBU confirmed that the semi-final allocation draw for the 2021 contest would not be held. Instead, the semi-finals would feature the same line-up of countries as determined by the draw for the 2020 contest's semi-finals, which was held on 28 January 2020 at Rotterdam's City Hall. Israel performed 12th in the first semi-final and qualified to the grand final. In the final, Eden performed in the first half of the show.

Arrangement 
The song is widely considered to be highly energetic and catchy has stylistically been described as "bright", "bouncy, athletic [and] infectious", as well as having the qualities of Pop music. Eden's vocal quality in the song was also highly praised.

Personnel
Credits adapted from Tidal.
 Amit Mordechai – producer, composer, lyricist, arranger
 Ido Netzer – producer, composer, lyricist, arranger
 Noam Zaltin – producer, composer, lyricist, arranger
 Ron Carmi – producer, composer, lyricist, arranger

Charts

References

2021 songs
2021 singles
Eurovision songs of 2021
Eurovision songs of Israel
Eden Alene songs